The Grice Inn is a hotel built in 1905 on East Elm St. in Wrightsville in Johnson County, Georgia.  It was listed on the National Register of Historic Places (NRHP) in 1978.

It was built by J.R. Grice as hotel and as a home for his family.  The NRHP nomination asserts it is "an unusual example of vernacular architecture whose
form is unique to Middle Georgia and contains stylistic elements unprecedented in the state. It is a landmark to the community of Wrightsville, haying played a significant role in the development of this small rural town during the period of its greatest growth."

References

National Register of Historic Places in Johnson County, Georgia
Hotel buildings completed in 1905
1905 establishments in Georgia (U.S. state)
Hotel buildings on the National Register of Historic Places in Georgia (U.S. state)